KKFG (104.5 FM) is a radio station  broadcasting a classic hits format. Licensed to Bloomfield, New Mexico, United States, the station serves the Four Corners area.  The station is currently owned by iHeartMedia and features programming from AP Radio, Fox News Radio and Premiere Networks.

History
The station was assigned the call letters KMYO on May 6, 1988. On September 18, 1989, the station changed its call sign to KCEM-FM. On March 15, 1992, the current KKFG call sign was assigned by the FCC.

References

External links

KFG
Classic hits radio stations in the United States
Radio stations established in 1988
1988 establishments in New Mexico
IHeartMedia radio stations